The Zoque languages form a primary branch of the Mixe–Zoquean language family indigenous to southern Mexico by the Zoque people.

Central (Copainalá) Zoque-language programming is carried by the CDI's radio station XECOPA, broadcasting from Copainalá, Chiapas.

There are over 100,000 speakers of Zoque languages. 74,000 people reported their language to be "Zoque" in a 2020 census, and an additional 36,000 reported their language to be Sierra Popoluca. Most of the remaining 8,400 "Popoluca" speakers are presumably also Zoque.

Languages
Zoquean languages fall in three groups:
Gulf Zoquean (Veracruz Zoque)
Sierra Popoluca (Soteapan Zoque)
Texistepec Popoluca
Ayapa Zoque (Tabasco Zoque)
Oaxacan Zoque
Chimalapa Zoque (dialects: Santa María Chimalapa, San Miguel Chimalapa)
Chiapas Zoque
Copainalá Zoque
Francisco León Zoque
Rayón Zoque (a dialect cluster) 

Justeson and Kaufman also classify Epi-Olmec as a Zoquean language, although this claim is disputed by Andrew Robinson.

Demographics
List of ISO 639-3 codes and demographic information of Mixean languages from Ethnologue (22nd edition):

References

 Wichmann, Søren, 1995. The Relationship Among the Mixe–Zoquean Languages of Mexico. University of Utah Press. Salt Lake City.

Recordings 
 Sierra Popoluca Collection of Lynda Boudreault at the Archive of the Indigenous Languages of Latin America. Contains audio recordings and transcriptions of Zoque and Soteapan in a wide range of genres. Some files are restricted but may be available upon request.

See also
Epi-Olmec script

Indigenous languages of Mexico
Mesoamerican languages
Mixe–Zoque languages
Articles citing INALI